Andrew Mathews is an American politician and member of the Minnesota Senate. A member of the Republican Party of Minnesota, he represents District 15 in central Minnesota.

Education and career
Mathews graduated with a Juris Doctor from Oak Brook College of Law, an unaccredited correspondence school. He is a pastor and works as a congressional veterans' caseworker.

Minnesota Senate
Mathews was elected to the Minnesota Senate in 2016.

Personal life
Mathews is married with two children and resides in Princeton, Minnesota.

References

External links

 Official Senate website
 Official campaign website

Living people
Republican Party Minnesota state senators
21st-century American politicians
People from Milaca, Minnesota
1987 births